Pelėdnagiai Eldership is a Lithuanian eldership, located in the south eastern part of Kėdainiai District Municipality.

Eldership was created from the Pelėdnagiai selsovet in 1993.

Geography
The territory of Pelėdnagiai Eldership is located mostly in the Nevėžis Plain and the Nevėžis river valley. Relief is mostly flat, cultivated as agriculture lands. Forests cover about 40 % of the eldership.

 Rivers: Nevėžis, Barupė, Urka, Mėkla, Lankesa, Ašarėna
 Lakes and ponds: Labūnava Reservoir.
 Forests: Labūnava Forest.
 Protected areas: Barupė Hydrographical Sanctuary, Lankesa Botanical Sanctuary, Pelėdnagiai Botanical Sanctuary, Labūnava Forest Biosphere Polygon.

Places of interest
Catholic church of the Divine in Labūnava
Juciūnai cemetery chapel
Aukupėnai cemetery tomb-chapel
Labūnava manor tower
Gelnai wayside chapel
Ancient burial site in Nociūnai and former cemetery site in Pašiliai
Soviet mosaic the "Land Improvers" in Pelėdnagiai

Populated places 
Following settlements are located in the Pelėdnagiai Eldership (as for the 2011 census):

Villages: Akmeniai · Ansainiai · Aukupėnai · Baldinka · Beinaičiai · Bučiūnai · Eiguliai · Gelnai · Ivaniškiai · Jagminai · Juciūnai · Kačergiai · Kruopiai · Kudžioniai · Labūnava · Liaudiškiai ·Lineliai · Liogailiškiai · Medekšiai · Nartautai · Nociūnai · Pabarupys · Pacūnai · Pamėkliai · Paobelys · Pašiliai · Pėdžiai · Pelėdnagiai · Puzaičiai · Saviečiai · Serbinai · Servitgaliai · Sičioniai · Slikiai · Stašaičiai · Šilainėliai · Šilainiai · Užkapiai · Vainiūnai · Zabieliškis · Žiogaičiai
 Hamlets: Rimuoliai
 Railway station settlements: Slikių GS
 Former settlements: Činkiai

References

Elderships in Kėdainiai District Municipality